Joan Evans may refer to:

 Joan Evans (art historian) (1893–1977), British art historian
 Joan Evans (actress) (born 1934), American film actress
 Joan Evans (charity worker), Australian religious sister and charity activist

See also
 Joanne Evans, New Zealand footballer